Delta Air Lines is one of the major airlines of the United States and a legacy carrier. One of the world's oldest airlines in operation, Delta is headquartered in Atlanta, Georgia. The airline, along with its subsidiaries and regional affiliates, including Delta Connection, operates over 5,400 flights daily and serves 325 destinations in 52 countries on six continents. Delta is a founding member of the SkyTeam airline alliance.  As of the end of 2022, it had 90,000 employees. 

Delta has nine hubs, with Atlanta being its largest in terms of total passengers and number of departures. It is ranked second among the world's largest airlines by number of passengers carried, passenger-miles flown, and fleet size. It is ranked first by revenue for commercially owned airline companies, and 113th on the Fortune 500.

History

Early history
The history of Delta Air Lines begins with the world's first aerial crop dusting operation called Huff Daland Dusters, Inc. The company was founded on March 2, 1925, in Macon, Georgia, before moving to Monroe, Louisiana, in summer 1925. It flew a Huff-Daland Duster, the first true crop duster, designed to combat the boll weevil infestation of cotton crops. C.E. Woolman, general manager and later Delta's first CEO, led a group of local investors to acquire the company's assets. Delta Air Service was incorporated on December 3, 1928, and named after the Mississippi Delta region.

Passenger operations began on June 17, 1929, from Dallas, Texas, to Jackson, Mississippi, with stops at Shreveport and Monroe, Louisiana. By June 1930, service had extended east to Atlanta and west to Fort Worth, Texas. Passenger service ceased in October 1930 when the airmail contract for the route Delta had pioneered was awarded to another airline, which purchased the assets of Delta Air Service. Local banker Travis Oliver, acting as a trustee, C.E. Woolman, and other local investors purchased back the crop-dusting assets of Delta Air Service and incorporated as Delta Air Corporation on December 31, 1930.

Delta Air Corporation secured an air mail contract in 1934, and began doing business as Delta Air Lines over Mail Route 24, stretching from Fort Worth, Texas, to Charleston, South Carolina. Delta moved its headquarters from Monroe, Louisiana, to its current location in Atlanta in 1941. The company name officially became Delta Air Lines in 1945. In 1946, the company commenced regularly scheduled freight transport. In 1949, the company launched the first discounted fares between Chicago and Miami. In 1953, the company launched its first international routes after the acquisition of Chicago and Southern Air Lines. In 1959, it was the first airline to fly the Douglas DC-8. In 1960, it was the first airline to fly Convair 880 jets. In 1964, it launched the Deltamatic reservation systems using computers in the IBM 7070 series. In 1965, Delta was the first airline to fly the McDonnell Douglas DC-9.

Growth and acquisitions
By 1970, Delta had an all-jet fleet, and in 1972 it acquired Northeast Airlines. Trans-Atlantic service began in 1978 with the first nonstop flights from Atlanta to London. In 1981, Delta launched a frequent-flyer program. In 1987, it acquired Western Airlines, and that same year Delta began trans-Pacific service (Atlanta-Portland, Oregon-Tokyo). In 1990, Delta was the first airline in the United States to fly McDonnell Douglas MD-11 jets. In 1991, it acquired substantially all of Pan Am's trans-Atlantic routes and the Pan Am Shuttle, rebranded as the Delta Shuttle. Delta was now the leading airline across the Atlantic.

In 1997, Delta was the first airline to board more than 100 million passengers in a calendar year. Also that year, Delta began an expansion of its international routes into Latin America. In 2003, the company launched Song, a low-cost carrier.

Bankruptcy and restructuring (2005–2007)
On September 14, 2005, the company filed for bankruptcy, citing rising fuel costs. It emerged from bankruptcy in April 2007 after fending off a hostile takeover from US Airways and its shares were re-listed on the New York Stock Exchange.

Acquisition of Northwest Airlines (2008–2010)
The acquisition of Northwest Airlines was announced April 14, 2008. It was approved and consummated on October 29, 2008. Northwest continued to operate as a wholly owned subsidiary of Delta until December 31, 2009, when the Northwest Airlines operating certificate was merged into that of Delta. Delta completed integration with Northwest on January 31, 2010, when their computer reservations system and websites were combined, and the Northwest Airlines brand was officially retired.

Destinations and hubs

Destinations

Delta and its worldwide alliance partners operate more than 15,000 flights per day. Delta is the only U.S. carrier that flies to Dakar and Copenhagen, and along with competitor United Airlines, are the only two U.S. carriers that fly to Stockholm.

In March 2020, Delta suspended all flights to continental Europe for 30 days, and cutting 40% of its capacity.

Hubs
Delta currently has nine hubs:
 Atlanta – Delta's hub for the Southeastern United States and its main gateway to Latin America and the Caribbean. In addition to its corporate headquarters, Delta operates its primary hub in Atlanta as well as Delta TechOps, which is Delta's primary maintenance base.
Boston – Delta's secondary transatlantic hub. It offers service to destinations in Europe and North America.
Detroit – One of Delta's two Midwest hubs. It is the primary Asian gateway for the Eastern United States and it also provides service to many destinations in the Americas and Europe. Former Northwest Airlines hub.
Los Angeles – Delta's secondary hub for the West Coast. It offers service to cities in Latin America, Asia, Australia, Europe, and major domestic cities and West Coast regional destinations. With 20% of the airport's market share (in 2022), Delta is the largest carrier at LAX.
Minneapolis/St. Paul – One of Delta's two Midwest hubs. It is the primary Canadian gateway for the airline and also serves many American metropolitan destinations, a number of regional destinations in the upper Midwest, and some select destinations in Europe and Asia. Former Northwest Airlines hub.
 New York–JFK –  Delta's primary transatlantic hub. The hub also offers service on many transcontinental "prestige routes" to Los Angeles, San Francisco, and Seattle.
New York–LaGuardia – Delta's second New York hub. Delta's service at LaGuardia covers numerous East Coast U.S. cities and a number of regional destinations in the U.S. and Canada.
Salt Lake City – Delta's hub for the Rocky Mountain region of the United States. Delta service covers most major U.S. destinations and a number of regional destinations in the U.S., emphasizing on the Rocky Mountains and select destinations in Canada and Mexico, and select cities in Europe and Hawaii.
Seattle/Tacoma – Delta's primary West Coast hub. The hub serves as an international gateway to Asia for the Western United States. Delta service also includes many major U.S. destinations as well as regional destinations in the Pacific Northwest.

Alliance and codeshare agreements
Delta is a member of the SkyTeam alliance and has codeshare agreements with the following airlines:

 Aerolíneas Argentinas
 Aeroméxico
 Air Europa 
 Air France
 China Airlines 
 China Eastern Airlines 
 Czech Airlines 
 Garuda Indonesia
 Hawaiian Airlines
 ITA Airways
 Kenya Airways
 KLM
 Korean Air
 LATAM Brasil
 LATAM Chile
 LATAM Colombia
 LATAM Perú
 Rex Airlines
 Seaborne Airlines
 Sky Express
 Transavia
 Vietnam Airlines
 Virgin Atlantic
 WestJet

Fleet

, Delta operated a fleet of 750 aircraft manufactured by Airbus and Boeing. Delta operates the largest Boeing 717, Boeing 757, and Boeing 767 fleets in the world, and the largest Airbus A330 fleet of any US airline. Prior to its 2008 merger with Northwest Airlines, Delta's fleet was made up of solely Boeing and McDonnell Douglas aircraft. Airbus aircraft from Northwest joined the fleet after the merger, and more have since been added.

Delta often seeks to acquire and utilize older aircraft, especially narrow-bodies, and it has created an extensive MRO (maintenance, repair, and overhaul) organization, called TechOps, to support them. However, in early 2011, Delta began talks with Airbus, Boeing and Bombardier Aerospace to discuss replacing the McDonnell Douglas DC-9s, McDonnell Douglas MD-88s, and older A320 and 757-200 aircraft. On August 22, 2011, Delta placed an order for 100 Boeing 737-900ER aircraft and deferred an order of 100 small narrow-body jets until 2012.

In July 2021, Delta Air Lines agreed to purchase 29 used 737-900ERs and lease seven used A350-900s as it aims to modernize its fleet and reduce its complexity.

Cabin

Delta underwent a cabin branding upgrade in 2015. Availability and exact details vary by route and aircraft type.

Delta One
Delta One is the airline's premier business class product, available on long-haul international flights, as well as transcontinental service from New York–Kennedy to Los Angeles, San Francisco and Seattle/Tacoma.

Delta One features lie-flat seating on all aircraft types, and direct aisle access from every seat on all types except the Boeing 757-200 (in which only a special sub-fleet of approximately 20 aircraft feature lie-flats). The Boeing 767-300ER seats, designed by James Thompson, feature a space-saving design whereby the seats are staggered such that when in the fully flat position, the foot of each bed extends under the armrests of the seat in front of it. On the Airbus A330 cabins, Delta One features the Cirrus flat-bed sleeper suite by Zodiac Seats U.S., configured in a reverse herringbone pattern.

All seats are also equipped with a personal, on demand in-flight-entertainment (IFE) system, universal power-ports, a movable reading light, and a folding work table. Passengers also receive complimentary chef-curated meals, refreshments, alcoholic beverages, an amenity kit, premium bedding, and pre-flight Sky Club access.

In August 2016, Delta announced the introduction of Delta One Suites on select widebody fleets. The suites will feature a door to the aisle for enhanced privacy, as well as improved storage space, a larger IFE screen, and updated design. The suites rolled out on the Airbus A350 fleet, first delivered in July 2017, followed by installation within the Boeing 777 fleet. Delta's Airbus A330-900, which began revenue service for the airline in July 2019, also features Delta One Suites. Also in July 2019, Delta began retrofitting a new seat on the 767-400ER, which featured increased privacy and design similar to Delta One Suites, though without a privacy door. These seats lack a door due to the 767's smaller cabin width.

Premium Select
In April 2016, Delta CEO Ed Bastian announced that a new Premium Economy cabin will be added. Since renamed to Premium Select, this cabin will feature extra legroom; adjustable leg rests; extra seat pitch, width, and recline; and a new premium service. Delta introduced it on its new Airbus A350, first delivered in fall 2017, to be followed by the now-retired Boeing 777. In October 2018, Delta announced that it would be selling first class seats on domestically configured Boeing 757 aircraft flying transatlantic routes as Premium Select. Delta's A330-900, delivered in 2019, also offers Premium Select. In 2021, Delta began retrofitting many of its 767-300ER and older A330 aircraft with Premium Select.

First Class
First Class is offered on mainline domestic flights (except those featuring Delta One service), select short- and medium-haul international flights, and Delta Connection aircraft. Passengers in this class receive a wider variety of free snacks compared to Main Cabin, as well as free drinks and alcohol, and full meal service on flights  and longer. Certain aircraft also feature power ports at each seat and free entertainment products from Delta Studio. First Class passengers are also eligible for priority boarding.

Delta Comfort+ seats are installed on all aircraft and feature  of pitch; on all Delta One configured aircraft,  of pitch and 50 percent more recline over standard Main Cabin seats. Additional amenities include: priority boarding, dedicated overhead space, complimentary beer, wine, and spirits on flights  or more, and complimentary premium snacks on flights  or more. Complimentary premium entertainment is available via Delta Studio, with free headsets available on most flights. On transcontinental flights between JFK-LAX/SFO, Delta Comfort+ passengers also get Luvo snack wraps. Certain Medallion members can upgrade from Main Cabin to Comfort+ for free right after booking, while other customers can upgrade for a fee or with SkyMiles. 

Main Cabin
The main cabin on some aircraft have an articulating seat bottom where the seat bottom moves forward in addition to the seat back tilting backwards when reclining.

Main Cabin passengers receive complimentary snacks and non-alcoholic drinks on all flights  or longer. Alcoholic beverages are also available for purchase. Complimentary meals and alcoholic drinks are provided on long-haul international flights as well as selected transcontinental domestic flights, such as between New York–JFK and Seattle, San Francisco, Los Angeles, and San Diego. As part of Delta's Flight Fuel buy on board program, meals are available for purchase on other North American flights  or longer.

Delta operated a different buy on board program between 2003 and 2005. The previous program had items from differing providers, depending on the origin and destination of the flight. Prices ranged up to $10 ($ when adjusted for inflation). The airline started the service on a few selected flights in July 2003, and the meal service was initially offered on 400 flights. Delta ended this buy on board program in 2005; instead, Delta began offering snacks at no extra charge on flights over 90 minutes to most U.S. domestic flights and some flights to the Caribbean and Latin America. Beginning in mid-March 2005 the airline planned to stop providing pillows on flights within the 48 contiguous U.S. states, Bermuda, Canada, the Caribbean, and Central America. In addition, the airline increased the price of alcoholic beverages on Delta mainline flights from $4 ($ when adjusted for inflation) to $5 ($ when adjusted for inflation); the increase in alcohol prices did not occur on Song flights.

Basic Economy
Basic Economy is a basic version of Main Cabin, offering the same services with fewer flexibility options for a lower price. Examples of fewer flexibility options include no ticket changes, no paid or complimentary upgrades regardless of frequent-flier status, and only having a seat assigned at check-in. As of December 2021, Basic Economy travelers no longer earn award miles (used for redeeming free travel, for example) or medallion qualifying miles (which count towards elite status).

Reward programs

SkyMiles

SkyMiles is the frequent flyer program for Delta Air Lines. Miles do not expire but accounts may be deactivated by Delta in certain cases, such as the death of a program member or fraudulent activity.

Delta Sky Club

Delta Sky Club is the branding name of Delta's airport lounges. Membership is available through an annual membership that can be purchased with either money or miles. International passengers traveling in Delta One class get free access. Membership can also be granted through top-level Delta status or by being an American Express cardholder with certain exceptions. As of January 2019, Delta no longer offered single-day passes.

Originally, Delta's membership-based airport clubs were called Crown Room lounges, with Northwest's called WorldClubs.

Exclusive Delta One Clubs for customers traveling in business class are slated to open at New York–Kennedy and Los Angeles in 2024.

SkyBonus
On November 27, 2001, Delta Air Lines launched SkyBonus, a program aimed toward small-to-medium businesses spending between $5,000 and $500,000 annually on air travel. Businesses can earn points toward free travel and upgrades, as well as Sky Club memberships and SkyMiles Silver Medallion status. Points are earned on paid travel based on a variety of fare amount paid, booking code, and place origin or destination. While enrolled businesses are able to earn points toward free travel, the travelling passenger is still eligible to earn SkyMiles during his or her travel.

In early 2010, Delta Air Lines merged its SkyBonus program with Northwest's similar Biz Perks program.

Corporate affairs

Finances 
For the fiscal year 2018, Delta Air Lines reported earnings of US$5.1 billion, with an annual revenue of US$44.438 billion, an increase of 8.02% over the previous fiscal cycle. Its shares traded at over $48 per share, and its market capitalization was valued at over US$39.182 billion in April 2019.

Personnel
Between its mainline operation and subsidiaries, and as of March 2015, Delta employs nearly 80,000 people. Ed Bastian is the current Chief Executive Officer and has served in this position since May 2, 2016. Joanne Smith is Executive Vice President and Chief People Officer responsible for the oversight and support of personnel needs at Delta. She was appointed on October 1, 2014, replacing Mike Campbell.

Delta's 14,500 mainline pilots are represented by the Air Line Pilots Association, International and are the union's largest pilot group. The company's approximately 180 flight dispatchers are represented by the Professional Airline Flight Control Association (PAFCA). Not counting the pilots and flight dispatchers, Delta is the only one of the five largest airlines in the United States, and one of only two in the top 9 (the other being JetBlue), whose non-pilot USA domestic staff is entirely non-union. In August 2020, as a result of the COVID-19 pandemic, Delta Air Lines announced that it would be cutting 1,941 pilot job positions if it could not conclude a cost reduction deal with its union. In January 2021, Delta said that, thanks to the federal support, it will be able to bring back 400 pilots in full time.

Delta Global Staffing 
Delta Global Staffing (DGS) was a temporary employment firm located in Atlanta, Georgia. Delta Global Staffing was a wholly owned subsidiary of Delta Air Lines, Inc., and a division of the internal company DAL Global Services.

Delta Air Lines sold majority ownership of DAL Global Services to Argenbright Holdings on December 21, 2018. As part of the sale, Delta dissolved the staffing division of DGS.

It was founded in 1995 as a provider of temporary staffing for Delta primarily in Atlanta.  DGS has since expanded to include customers and businesses outside the airline and aviation industries. DGS now supports customers in major US metropolitan areas.

Delta Global Staffing provided contract workers for short and long term assignments, VMS partnering, VOP on-site management, temp-to-hire, direct placements, and payroll services. DGS services markets such as call centers, customer services and administrative placements, IT & professional recruiting, logistics, finance & accounting, hospitality, and aviation/airline industry.

Headquarters and offices
Delta's corporate headquarters is located on a corporate campus on the northern boundary of Hartsfield–Jackson Atlanta International Airport, within the city limits of Atlanta. This location has served as Delta's headquarters since 1941, when the company relocated its corporate offices from Monroe, Louisiana, to Greater Atlanta. The crop dusting division of Delta remained headquartered in Monroe until Delta ceased crop dusting in 1966. Before 1981, the Delta corporate campus, an  plot of land in proximity to the old Hartsfield Airport terminal, was outside the City of Atlanta limits in unincorporated Fulton County. As of 1981 Delta would have had to begin paying $200,000 annually to the City of Atlanta in taxes. In September 1981, the airline sued the city, challenging the annexation on the basis of the constitutionality of the 1960 City of Atlanta annexation of the Hartsfield old terminal. The City of Atlanta was only permitted to annex areas that are adjacent to areas already in the Atlanta city limits.

In addition to hosting Delta's corporate headquarters, Hartsfield–Jackson is also the home of Delta TechOps, the airline's primary maintenance, repair, and overhaul arm and the largest full-service airline MRO in North America, specializing in engines, components, airframe, and line maintenance.

Delta maintains a large presence in the Twin Cities, with over 12,000 employees in the region as well as significant corporate support functions housed in the Minneapolis area, including the company's information technology divisional offices.

Corporate identity

Delta's logo, often called the "widget", was originally unveiled in 1959. Its triangle shape is taken from the Greek letter delta, and recalls the airline's origins in the Mississippi Delta. It is also said to be reminiscent of the swept-wing design of the DC-8, Delta's first jet aircraft.

Delta's current livery is called "Upward & Onward". It features a white fuselage with the company's name in blue lettering and a widget on the vertical stabilizer. Delta introduced its current livery in 2007 as part of a re-branding after it emerged from bankruptcy. The new livery consists of four colors, while the old one (called "colors in motion") used eight. This meant the switch saved the airline money by removing one day from each aircraft's painting cycle. The airline took four years to repaint all of its aircraft into the current scheme, including aircraft inherited from Northwest Airlines.

Design collaborations

In 2017 Delta introduced in-flight serviceware designed by the Italian homewares company Alessi. The pieces are used in its premium cabins: Delta One, First Class and Delta Premium Select. Detla has also collaborated with TUMI and Kiehl's to provide amenity kits in its premium cabins and SkyClubs.

Environmental initiatives
In 2008, Delta Air Lines was given an award from the United States Environmental Protection Agency's Design for the Environment (DfE) program for its use of PreKote, a more environmentally friendly, non-hexavalent chromium surface pretreatment on its aircraft, replacing hazardous chemicals formerly used to improve paint adhesion and prevent corrosion. In addition, PreKote reduces water usage by two-thirds and reduces wastewater treatment.

PreKote is also saving money by reducing the time needed to paint each airplane. With time savings of eight to ten percent, it will save an estimated more than $1 million annually.

In popular culture

Deltalina

As part of the re-branding project, a safety video featuring a flight attendant showed up on YouTube in early 2008, getting over 1 million views and the attention of news outlets, specifically for the video's tone mixed with the serious safety message. The flight attendant, Katherine Lee, was dubbed "Deltalina" by a member of FlyerTalk for her resemblance to Angelina Jolie. Delta had considered several styles for its current safety video, including animation, before opting for a video presenting a flight attendant speaking to the audience. The video was filmed on a former Song Airlines Boeing 757-200.

Accidents and incidents
The following are major accidents and incidents that occurred on Delta mainline aircraft. For Northwest Airlines incidents, see Northwest Airlines accidents and incidents. For Delta Connection incidents, see Delta Connection incidents and accidents.

All told, in 13 fatal accidents involving at least one death, 299 passengers and crew died, 11 on two other aircraft died (in two collision accidents), and 14 persons on the ground died (in two accidents).

The attempted bombing of Northwest Airlines Flight 253 on December 25, 2009, occurred four days before the operating certificates of Northwest and Delta were combined (December 31, 2009). The aircraft involved in the incident was in Delta livery and reported in some early news reports as "Delta Flight 253".

Hijackings
There have been over a dozen attempted hijackings that resulted in no injuries and the surrender of the often lone hijacker. These incidents are not included. The following are notable hijackings because of fatalities or success in forcing the aircraft to fly to another country:
 On February 21, 1968, a Delta DC-8 was hijacked to Havana, Cuba. This was the first successful hijacking to Cuba from the U.S. since 1961, and was the start of multiple hijacking attempts to Cuba in the late 1960s. This coincided with the introduction of passenger screening using metal detectors in U.S. airports starting in the late 1960s.
 On July 31, 1972, Delta Flight 841, a Detroit to Miami DC-8 flight, was hijacked to Algiers, Algeria by 8 hijackers. The aircraft stopped in Boston to pick up an international navigator. The flight was allowed to return with passengers to the U.S., stopping in Barcelona for refueling.
 On February 22, 1974, Samuel Byck, an unemployed tire salesman from Pennsylvania, shot and killed an Aviation Police Officer, then stormed aboard Delta Air Lines Flight 523, a McDonnell Douglas DC-9 flight at Baltimore Friendship Airport (now Baltimore–Washington International Airport) scheduled to fly to Atlanta, and shot both pilots, killing the First Officer, Fred Jones. He intended to crash the plane into the White House. After shooting the pilots, the hijacker grabbed a passenger and demanded that she fly the aircraft. The passengers meanwhile fled the aircraft. The hijacking attempt ended when, after a standoff with police, Byck was shot twice through an aircraft porthole by a Maryland policeman, severely wounding him. Before police stormed the plane, Byck killed himself. The plane never left the gate during this incident.
 On August 23, 1980, a Delta Air Lines L-1011 on a San Juan to Los Angeles flight was hijacked and flown to Cuba. The hijacker was jailed by Cuban authorities, and all passengers were released unharmed.
 On September 13, 1980, a Delta Air Lines New Orleans to Atlanta flight was taken over by two hijackers and forced to fly to Cuba. The flight continued to Atlanta after stopping in Havana. The hijackers were imprisoned by Cuban authorities. One hijacker was released and later sought US residency. The suspect was later arrested by US authorities in 2002 and sentenced to 10 years in prison the following year.
 Additional hijackings that resulted in no injuries and the flight landing in Cuba include March 28, 1984 (Delta 357, a 727, New Orleans-Dallas), August 18, 1983 (Delta 784, a 727, Miami-Tampa), July 17, 1983 (Delta 722, a 727, Miami-Tampa), and June 11, 1979 (Delta 1061, a L-1011, New York LaGuardia-Fort Lauderdale).

See also
 Air transportation in the United States
 Delta Flight Museum
 Delta Global Staffing
 List of airlines of the United States
 List of airports in the United States
 Transportation in the United States
 Delta Ship 41

References
Notes

Bibliography

External links

 
 

 
Companies listed on the New York Stock Exchange
Companies in the Dow Jones Transportation Average
Airlines established in 1928
American companies established in 1928
Companies based in Atlanta
Companies that filed for Chapter 11 bankruptcy in 2005
SkyTeam
Airlines based in Georgia (U.S. state)
1928 establishments in Georgia (U.S. state)
Airlines for America members